DHFC may refer to:
David Horowitz Freedom Center in California
Dulwich Hamlet Football Club in London